Rotenbach is a river of Baden-Württemberg, Germany. It flows into the Jagst near Ellwangen.

See also
List of rivers of Baden-Württemberg

Rivers of Baden-Württemberg
Ellwangen Hills
Rivers of Germany